Mařenice is a municipality and village in Česká Lípa District in the Liberec Region of the Czech Republic. It has about 300 inhabitants.

Administrative parts
Villages of Dolní Světlá, Horní Světlá and Mařeničky are administrative parts of Mařenice.

References

Villages in Česká Lípa District